The 2004 San Jose State Spartans football team represented San Jose State University in the 2004 NCAA Division I-A football season. The team played their home games at Spartan Stadium in San Jose, California. They participated as members of the Western Athletic Conference. They were coached by head coach Fitz Hill, who resigned after the end of the season to become a "Visiting Scholar" position at the University of Central Florida’s DeVos Sports Business Management Program.

The Spartans' 70-63 win over Rice on October 2 set an NCAA record for overall points scored by both teams in regulation.

Attendance issues and possible cancellation of football
The San Jose Mercury News reported in March 2004 that budget cuts led some faculty members at San Jose State to advocate removing the SJSU football program from Division IA athletics. Locally there was much speculation that San Jose State would drop football due to poor attendance and student-athlete graduation rates.

Read-2-Lead Classic
The "Read-2-Lead Classic" was an attempt to help the football team achieve average attendance of 15,000 to retain NCAA Division I-A status.  With an emphasis on literacy, the university hosted a series of events in September 2004, including a conversation with comedian Bill Cosby and a concert by Boyz II Men.   The game sold just 11,360 tickets. In contrast, the 2003 Read-2-Lead Classic had an official attendance of over 31,000.

Schedule

Roster

Game summaries

at Stanford

Morgan State

at SMU

Rice

at Washington

at Hawaii

No. 24 UTEP

at Nevada

No. 10 Boise State (2OT)

at Tulsa

Fresno State

References

San Jose State
San Jose State Spartans football seasons
San Jose State Spartans football